Chris d'Eon (born 1985), mononymously known as d'Eon, is a Canadian electronic musician, singer-songwriter, producer, and composer based in Montreal, Quebec. He is known for his musical eclectism, which encompasses various elements of electronica, pop, avant-garde music, and world music.

Early life
Chris d'Eon began making music at four years old after receiving synthesizers and a sequencer from his parents. He took professional music courses as a teenager before dropping out of his studies entirely.

In 2008, d'Eon travelled to the Himalayas and was taught how to play the dramyin by a Tibetan musician. During this trip, he moved to the Dip Tse Chok Ling monastery and didn't speak for months. This trip greatly influenced his musical eclecticism, as upon returning to Canada, d'Eon began incorporating dramyin and other elements of Eastern music into his music.

Career

2009-2010: Wa Al-'Asr, Æon, and Palinopsia
d'Eon's first music released was the second half of a split album with Omon Ra, released in 2009. This would be the first in a series of five cassettes produced and distributed between 2009 and 2010 with d'Eon as a performer, three featuring him as a solo artist. Among these is d'Eon's debut album, Wa Al-'Asr, which was released in late 2009 through Numbers Station Recordings. The song "Tear Down the Wall" from Wa Al-'Asr received a music video directed by Matthew Wilson, who later joined d'Eon in psychedelic rock band Omon Ra II.

Subsequent cassette tapes released during 2010 through Numbers Station included d'Eon's second album Æon, a second split album with Canadian musician Dirty Beaches and d'Eon as a part of Omon Ra II as the group's first and only project, and a four-track EP titled Swan Covers near the end of the year, which was composed of d'Eon's own interpolations of songs by experimental rock band Swans. Palinopsia, d'Eon's third album, was also released later in the year through Hippos in Tanks to commercial success.

2011-2012: Darkbloom, Music for Keyboards, and LP
His subsequent release, Darkbloom was a split EP featuring fellow Canadian musician Grimes and gained attention from various music publications, including Spin, Pitchfork, and Exclaim!. On June 23, 2011, d'Eon also released an EP of instrumental outtakes from the production of Darkbloom entitled Darkbloom Sessions through SoundCloud.

In 2012, d'Eon released a free mixtape titled Music for Keyboards Vol. I, which was described as a "prelude" to his next upcoming album and compiled miscellaneous, mostly unreleased instrumentals spanning back to 2003. The mixtape was soon followed by Music for Keyboards Vol. II: "What's My Age Again" Variants and several further installments in the series were released in later years. d'Eon's highly anticipated fourth album, LP, was released in 2012 to significant praise.

2013-2018: Foxconn / Trios and side projects
d'Eon began working on music under the side project Kallisti in 2013. Between working on the Kallisti project and his Music for Keyboards series, d'Eon released his fifth album Foxconn / Trios on November 27, 2015. Similar to Darkbloom Sessions, d'Eon released a companion EP to Foxconn / Trios entitled Foxconn / Trios Sessions.

In 2016, d'Eon released an album entitled Patriot as Eva Weishaupt, a more political side project. He also contributed the track "WHAT'S IN YOUR CLOSET?" to the political compilation album World War 2020 - Episode Four (2016 Version): WikiLeaks vs. DNC under the Eva Weishaupt alias.

2019-present: Rhododendron
On March 6, 2019, d'Eon returned from a musical hiatus with his sixth studio album Six Trios. Earlier that year and under the new side project D. Jung, d'Eon had released an album titled Griffintown Swing, inspired by the neighborhood of Griffintown where he once lived. d'Eon also returned to music in his Kallisti project, releasing the album The Rave is Not a Sacred Place on April 13, 2019 through B&R Records, his new record label for his projects as Kallisti and D. Jung.

d'Eon released his seventh album From the Root of Jesse Sprouts a Splendid Flower on February 13, 2020, the album based around religion and Christianity. In 2021, he released three studio albums, including his eighth album Four Trios, which continued in the musical direction of his album Six Trios, and his ninth album Bijoux, both released in February of that year.

On August 13, 2021, d'Eon released his tenth studio album Rhododendron through Hausu Mountain Records, marking his first release in six years to be released in physical format. Rhododendron gained attention from various music publications upon its release and was praised for its musical diversity. The song "Rhododendron pt. I" also received a music video directed by the Stiner Brothers.

Sound and image
d'Eon's music has been met with critical acclaim. Andy Kellman of Allmusic compared his musical style to "vintage new age and contemporary experimental electronic artists, '80s mainstream pop, throwback house, and left-of-center R&B" and noted "Arabic, Iranian, and Turkish" influences. He was also compared to Oneohtrix Point Never and DJ Deeon. Alex Hudson of Exclaim! describes d'Eon's music as a juxtaposition of genres such as "Chicago footwork, new jack swing, UK drum & bass and trip hop". Ambient and Tibetan music elements in his music have also been noted.

Personal life
d'Eon is a Catholic.

Discography

Studio albums

Mixtapes

Extended plays

Mixes
FACT Mix 338 (2012, FACT magazine)
The Lord Himself Is The Farm, Himself He Grows And Grinds (2012, DIS)
D'Eon Live Set Boiler Room Montreal
Extracts From the Erisian Front 1
NTS Session: 26-9-16

Music videos
"Tear Down the Wall" (2009, directed by Matthew Wilson)
"Kill a Man With a Joystick in Your Hand" (2010, directed by Todd Ledford)
"Transparency" (2011, directed by Grimes)
"Arc of Fire" (2013, directed by Lorenzo Senni)
"Rhododendron pt. I" (2021, directed by Stiner Brothers)

Notes

References

External links
d'Eon on Bandcamp
d'Eon on Hippos in Tanks

Living people
Ambient musicians
Canadian electronic musicians
Canadian experimental musicians
Canadian keyboardists
Canadian male singers
Canadian rhythm and blues musicians
Canadian world music musicians
Musicians from Halifax, Nova Scotia
People from Dartmouth, Nova Scotia
Singers from Montreal
New-age musicians
Synth-pop musicians
Converts to Roman Catholicism
Canadian traditionalist Catholics
1985 births